The Wild Racers is a 1968 American film directed by Daniel Haller and starring Fabian, Mimsy Farmer, and Judy Cornwell. The screenplay concerns a Grand Prix racing car driver.

Plot
Stock car racer Jo Jo Quillico goes to Europe after an accident. He is hired by a race-car tycoon to be runner-up for a more experienced racer on the European circuit, working with his mechanic Charlie. However, in his first race, Jo Jo can't help winning.

He has a series of love affairs, including with a shallow Englishwoman, but cannot see himself in a long-term relationship – until he meets Katherine. He falls in love and begins to support his racing-car partner. When his partner is injured, Jo Jo takes his chance and scores several victories. However, he breaks up with Katherine.

Cast
Fabian as Jo Jo Quillico
Mimsy Farmer as Katherine Pearson
Alan Haufrect as Virgil
Judy Cornwell as Pippy
David Landau as Ian
Warwick Sims as Charlie
Talia Shire
Dick Miller

Production
The film was partly funded by Roger Corman. Tamara Asseyev was working as Corman's assistant when assigned to help produce the film.

Haller later said, "That movie began when Roger asked me to develop the script with Chuck Griffith. That meant I drove Chuck to Santa Barbara in my car and wouldn’t let him out of the hotel room until he had a certain amount of pages done. Then we went to Palm Springs and he’d dry out there. We finally ended up in La Jolla writing for a day or so there. After a week, we came back with the finished script."
 
Haller said the original play was to go to Europe. Corman would direct the first unit and Haller would direct second unit – namely, filming all the races on Sunday. However, when he got to Europe, Corman had already shot one of the races and told Haller since that Haller knew the script better than Corman did, Haller should direct first unit while Corman did second unit. Eventually Corman went home for portions of the shoot. Asseyev says Daniel Haller only agreed to direct it if Roger Corman agreed to also finance Haller's pet project, Paddy (1970).

The Wild Racers was shot in six countries in five and a half weeks with two weeks preparation. Most of the movie was filmed on locations without permission. "We were one step ahead of the law the whole time", says Haller. This was a method which had been used by Corman on The Young Racers (1963). Talia Coppola played the second lead, scouted locations and did the set dressings. During production the film was known as Hell's Racers.

Mimsy Farmer was working in a hospital in Canada when director Dan Haller called asking if she wanted to be in the film. "I jumped at the chance to go to Europe and also to see my brother Philip, who was living in London at the time", she later recalled. "It was the best move I’d made up to then and I loved traveling in France, Spain, and Holland."

The racing advisers were Peter Theobald (English), Jan Pieter Visser (Dutch), Jean Pierre Arlet (French) and Carlos Diego (Spanish).

The movie was shot by Nestor Almendros, and Daniel Lacambre worked as camera operator. Almendros later called the experience on the film influential in his career:
It was an insignificant movie. But the importance of the experience was we learned to work very fast. It's a two fold area; we realized that because you are faster, you are not necessarily worse in cinema; and because you take a long time to prepare something, it's not necessarily going to be better. With every shot you take time somehow; some shots you take longer than with others. But, on the whole, you just have to go ahead and shoot and follow your intuition. Sometimes if you think too much you sort of lose the intuition and the natural flow.
Dan Haller later recalled:
If I didn't think we had gotten a shot, I'd have Nestor shoot it again and have them print both takes. But by the time we got to Paris we were totally exhausted because it was a really grueling schedule and I would never even get to see a location. Talia Coppola was with us on the film and she would be scouting locations for us, and I'd tell her when you get to Rouen, or someplace like that, just go buy all the postcards you can and we'll use that to find our locations. That's how we did a lot of it.
Part of the film was shot in Paris during the 1968 riots and also Spain. Haller said Alemndros, a fugitive from Franco's Spain, was highly anxious during the Spanish leg of the shoot for fear he would be arrested for leaving the country.

Roger Corman said the film included "one of the greatest examples of co-ordinated shooting I've ever been involved with." Corman:
When we were in Paris we wanted a scene by the eternal flame of the Arc de Triomphe. Not only could we not get permission to shoot there, we didn't even have permission to be shooting in France! (laughter) So we worked out a sequence where I was in one car, Nestor was in one car, Chuck Hannawalt was in one car, and the two actors, Fabian and Mimsy Farmer, were in another car. The actors had already rehearsed the scene and we all drove around the Arc de Triomphe and then stopped our cars. We stopped traffic and everyone ran out to get the shot. Nestor put the camera down and Fabian and Mimsy knew exactly where to go. Dan got the shot and we jumped back in our cars and took off.|author=Peter Gardiner, who had done film effects for Roger Corman on The Trip, provided special effects. 
One of the lead actors was dubbed by Corman regular Dick Miller, who appears in a cameo.

Frances Doel worked as a script supervisor.

Joe Dante who later worked for Corman at New World Pictures said that:
The idea is, the guy went from race to race, and they had to have the races look different. They used blackand-white footage and tinted it several colors. They used stock footage from different pictures. There's hardly a shot in the picture that lasts more than ten seconds. It was like an art film, without being an art film. It was a movie art film.

Reception
Haller claimed he didn't think AIP "wanted to release the film at all".

The Christian Science Monitor called it "unusually well-photographed... the film is aimed at teenagers but thwarts its own purpose by inclusion of too much sexuality."

Quentin Tarantino later described The Wild Racers as his favorite racing car film:
It's shot like an Antonioni movie, with very little dialogue, most of which is voice-over. And no shot in the movie lasts more than twenty seconds. The quick edits keep you on the edge of your seat. It's very avant-garde, but it still delivers a proper racing movie. Classy.

See also
 List of American films of 1969
List of American films of 1968

References

External links

The Wild Racers at New York Times
The Wild Racers at Grindhouse Database

1969 films
1960s sports films
American International Pictures films
American auto racing films
Films directed by Daniel Haller
Films directed by Roger Corman
Films produced by Roger Corman
1960s English-language films
1960s American films